Morris Elite Soccer Club is an American soccer club based in Union, New Jersey that competes in the Metropolitan Division of USL League Two. They will begin play in the 2021 USL League Two season.

The club was founded in 2016 by former professional player Vincenzo Bernardo. They will also run teams in the USL Academy League.

Year-by-year

Notable players

References

USL League Two teams
Association football clubs established in 2016
Soccer clubs in New Jersey